K173 or K-173 may refer to:

K-173 (Kansas highway), a state highway in Kansas
Russian submarine Krasnoyarsk (K-173), a Russian submarine